Somatocleptes is a genus of longhorn beetles of the subfamily Lamiinae, containing the following species:

 Somatocleptes apicicornis  (Fauvel, 1906)
 Somatocleptes ovalis Breuning, 1947

References

Parmenini